Umbilicus chrysanthus, known as Venus' navel or nabelkraut, is a succulent, perennial flowering plant in the family Crassulaceae, in the genus Umbilicus, which is found in the Alps. It is called Venusnabel in German, but the French translation nombril de Vénus refers to navelwort.

chrysanthus
Flora of the Alps
Flora of Europe